INS Khanderi (S22) is the second of the Indian Navy's six s being built in India. It is a diesel-electric attack submarine which was designed by French naval defence and energy company DCNS and manufactured at Mazagon Dock Limited in Mumbai.

The submarine inherits its name and pennant number from INS Khanderi (S22) which served in the Navy from 1968–1989, and was named after Maratha Emperor Chhatrapati Shivaji Maharaj's island fort of Khanderi.

Construction

The submarine was launched in the presence of Minister of State for Defence Subhash Bhamre, Chief of the Naval Staff Admiral Sunil Lanba  and other dignitaries on 12 January 2017. The submarine began its sea trials on 1 June 2017.

The submarine was commissioned by Defence Minister Rajnath Singh on 28 September 2019.

See also
 List of submarines of the Indian Navy

References

Attack submarines
2017 ships
Ships built in India
Kalvari-class submarines
Submarines of the Indian Navy